Nikita Chandak (born September 5, 1995) is a Nepali model, actress, and beauty pageant titleholder. She won the title of Miss Nepal 2017. She also won the Miss Popular Choice and Miss Confident titles, respectively. She represented Nepal at Miss World 2017, held in Sanya City Arena, Sanya, China. Chandak ventured into acting by playing the lead role in the 2020 film, Sanglo.

Early life and education
Nikita Chandak was born in Urlabari city, Morang. She is the daughter of Anil and Sushma Chandak. She is from the Marwari community. 

Chandak completed her secondary education at the Pashupati Boarding Secondary School. She completed her high school at the LK Singhania Education Center, Gotan. She studied fashion communication at the JD Institute of Fashion Technology, India in Bengaluru.

Career

Pageantry 
Chandak won her first title at the age of 20, when she won the Miss Nepal 2017 competition. She was the first Miss Nepal to be placed in the Top 30 of the Model competition. She was the 2nd-runner up in the Multimedia award, and was in the top 10 in the People's Choice Award. She was placed in top 20 in her Beauty with a Purpose project. She won the head-to-head challenge from Group 3 which helped her get to top 40 in the pageant.

Acting 
Chandak started her acting career by starring in the Nepali movie Sanglo alongside Biraj Bhatta (who also directed the film). The movie was released on 7 February 2020.

References

Living people
Miss Nepal winners
Nepalese female models
Nepalese beauty pageant winners
Miss World 2017 delegates
1995 births
People from Morang District